Mohammed ben Othman, also known as Mohammed el Kebir was the Bey of the Western Beylik from 1776 to 1796. He is most well known for re-conquering Oran and Mers El Kébir from the Spaniards. He was known as a reformist.

Biography 
He was the son of a Bey of Titteri called "Othamn al-Kurdi" who was of mixed Kurdish-Algerian ancestry. His date of birth is unknown, although it is known that the Khaznadar (treasurer) of the Dey estimated him to be between 40 and 45 years old when he met him in 1779. Mohammed was appointed Caid of Flitta, and important position in the western Beylik. He was appointed as "khalifa" (supreme military commander) of the Western Beylik in 1768, and in 1775 during the reign of Ibrahim of Miliana he valiantly led more than 4,000 fighters from the Western Beylik durin the Spanish Invasion of Algiers in 1775. He played no small part of the battle and is said to have led a brilliant cavalry charge against the Spanish troops camped around El Harrach. In 1776 Ibrahim of Miliana died, but despite his wild popularity and great honor, Mohammed was discarded in favor of a very rich and influential man called "Hadj Khrellil".

Hadj Khrellil died in 1779, after which Mohammed finally ascended as the Bey of Mascara. Possessing good revenues, he decided to further invest into the economy, and well-being of his people. He stomped out the famine which started under the reign of Hadj Khrellil and opened soup kitchens in the palace of Mascara to further alleviate starvation. He also invested into the education of the region, building a new Madrasa and library in Mascara, and renovating several old and crumbling schools in Tlemcen and Mostaganem. He also wished to increase control over the Sahara, leading several expeditions to pacify and subjugate autonomous cities and oases in the northern Sahara. He was a greatly respected leader and the Bey of Tunis and the Sultan of Morocco regularly exchanged gifts with him. During his reign a small gold mine was discovered, further boosting his income. His best known achievement was recapturing Oran from the Spaniards in 1792, of which several qasidas were written. He moved his capital to Oran, and died in 1796, his reign was one of the last positive ones for Oran, and after his death, the Beylik of the West began an age of decline thanks to corruption and lack of actions which would remain until the last bey of Oran, Hassan Bey capitulated to the French in 1831.

References 

1796 deaths
18th-century monarchs in Africa
18th-century Algerian people